This list covers the chiefs of the General Directorate of Security (Turkish National Police) since 1923.

References

Chiefs of the Directorate of General Security
 
Turkey